Farhad Hossain (born 10 February 1987) is a first-class and List A cricketer from Bangladesh.

He made his debut for Rajshahi Division in the 2004/5 season. Up to the end of the 2006/7 season he had scored 903 first-class runs at 27.36 with five fifties and a top score of 79 against Barisal Division. He had taken 25 wickets with his off breaks with an average of 22.92 with a best of 4 for 50 against Chittagong Division. In the one day arena his unbeaten 89 against Sylhet Division is his best knock to date while he took 4 for 22 against Dhaka Division.

He played for Barisal Burners in the Bangladesh Premier League 2012.

References

Bangladeshi cricketers
Rajshahi Division cricketers
Rajshahi Royals cricketers
Fortune Barishal cricketers
Living people
Abahani Limited cricketers
Gazi Group cricketers
Kala Bagan Krira Chakra cricketers
Bangladesh North Zone cricketers
Dhaka Division cricketers
Khulna Division cricketers
1987 births
People from Rajshahi District